Davidson Ezinwa (born 22 November 1971) is a former sprinter from Nigeria.

He won a silver medal at the 1992 Summer Olympics as well as a silver medal at the 1997 World Championships, both in 4 x 100 metres relay. He also won a 60 metres silver medal at the 1997 World Indoor Championships.

In 100 metres his personal best time is 9.94 seconds, although he has recorded 9.91 s, albeit with a doubtful wind reading of -2.3 m/s which is an unlikely weather condition for records. In any case his result ranks him second in Nigeria, behind Olusoji Fasuba, and fifth in Africa, behind Ferdinand Omanyala, Akani Simbine, Fasuba and Frankie Fredericks. His personal best 200 metres time is 20.30 seconds, from 1990.

Ezinwa established a new World junior record in the 100-meter dash in 1990 (10.05), breaking Stanley Floyd's ten-year-old record (10.07). Ezinwa's record was not broken until 2003, when Darrel Brown ran a 10.01 100-meter dash.

He is the identical twin brother of Osmond Ezinwa. Both attended the Christian university Azusa Pacific University. Davidson Ezinwa tested positive for doping twice; for ephedrine in February 1996, and together with Osmond for hCG in 1999.

References

External links
 
 
 

1971 births
Living people
Nigerian male sprinters
Igbo sportspeople
Athletes (track and field) at the 1988 Summer Olympics
Athletes (track and field) at the 1992 Summer Olympics
Athletes (track and field) at the 1996 Summer Olympics
Olympic athletes of Nigeria
Olympic silver medalists for Nigeria
Athletes (track and field) at the 1990 Commonwealth Games
Commonwealth Games silver medallists for Nigeria
Doping cases in athletics
Nigerian sportspeople in doping cases
Nigerian twins
Azusa Pacific University alumni
Commonwealth Games medallists in athletics
Twin sportspeople
World Athletics Championships medalists
World Athletics Indoor Championships medalists
Medalists at the 1992 Summer Olympics
Olympic silver medalists in athletics (track and field)
African Games gold medalists for Nigeria
African Games medalists in athletics (track and field)
Athletes (track and field) at the 1995 All-Africa Games
Identical twins
20th-century Nigerian people
21st-century Nigerian people
Medallists at the 1990 Commonwealth Games